The Buganda region is one of the four regions in the country of Uganda. It is coterminous with the Kingdom of Buganda, one of the ancient African monarchies that are constitutionally recognised in Uganda.

Districts 

, the Central region contains 24 districts:

References

External links 
 Google Map of the Central Region of Uganda

 
Regions of Uganda